Marselino Ferdinan Philipus (born 9 September 2004) is an Indonesian professional footballer who plays as a attacking midfielder for Belgian First Division B club Deinze and the Indonesia national team. He is the younger brother of Oktafianus Fernando.

Marselino started his senior career with Persebaya Surabaya in 2021, emerging through its youth system. During his first season he became a regular starter and won the Liga 1 Best Young Player Award and was named of as one of the 60 most talented and promising players by The Guardian in the same year. He joined Belgian side Deinze in February 2023.

Marselino has represented Indonesia at various youth level, finishing third at the 2019 AFF U-15 Championship and winning bronze medal at the 2021 Southeast Asian Games. He made his senior international debut in 2022, becoming the second youngest Indonesian debutants and scored his first goal at the Asian Cup qualifiers becoming the nation's youngest goalscorer.

Club career

Persebaya Surabaya
Marselino broke into the senior team of Persebaya Surabaya in the 2021–22 Liga 1 season a few days after his 17th birthday following two years in its youth system. He debuted in a 12 September 2021 Liga 1 match against Persikabo 1973 that ended with a 3–1 victory for Persebaya. On 6 November 2021, he scored his first league goal and saved his team from defeat in a 2–2 draw with rival Arema. On 4 December 2021, he scored the opening goal in the first half and give his first assists to Taisei Marukawa in Persebaya's 2–0 win over Barito Putera at Manahan Stadium. 

On 5 January 2022, Marselino give another assists to Samsul Arif in early of first half, and scoring in second half in Persebaya's 3–1 win over Bali United. nine days laters, he was involved in Persebaya's 2–1 win over PSM Makassar, scoring in the 55th minute. On 23 August, Marselino scored the decisive goal before match ended in a 1–0 home win against PSIS Semarang at the Gelora Bung Tomo Stadium, he was also selected as man of the match in that match.

On 18 January 2023, Marselino scored a brace for the club in a 0–5 away win against Persita Tangerang.

KMSK Deinze

On 1 February 2023, Marselino officially joined Belgian First Division B club, Deinze with a one and a half year contract. Marcelino made his debut with Deinze against Jong Genk on 25 February, where he got subbed on in the 80th minute replacing Jellert van Landschoot.

International career
Marselino started to represent Indonesia from the age of 14 when he debuted in a Indonesia U-17 team match against Vietnam U-17 in the 2019 AFF U-15 Championship. He scored his first international goal in that debut that ended with a 2–0 win.

In October 2021, Marselino joined the Indonesia U23 team for friendlies against Tajikistan U-23 and Nepal U-23 during preparations in Tajikistan for the 2022 AFC U-23 Asian Cup qualification. On 26 October 2021, he debuted in an official U-23 international game as a substitute in a 2–3 loss against Australia U23 in the 2022 AFC U-23 Asian Cup qualification.

In January 2022, Marselino crossed another milestone when he was called up to the Indonesia senior team for two friendly matches against Timor Leste in Bali. He earned his first senior cap on 27 January 2022 in the first match that ended with a 4–1 win for Indonesia. He became the second-youngest Indonesian to play for the main national team at the age of 17 years 4 months and 18 days, just behind Ronaldo Kwateh who debuted in the same match.

Marselino was part of the Indonesia U-23 team that won bronze in the 2021 Southeast Asian Games. He scored two goals in the six matches that he played in that tournament, including in a 3-1 victory against Myanmar U23.

Marselino became the youngest goal-scorer in the senior team after scoring against Nepal in the 2023 AFC Asian Cup qualification in a 7–0 win. Marselino was a part of the Indonesia U-20 team that played in the 2023 AFC U-20 Asian Cup qualification. On 16 September 2022, he scored a brace against Hong Kong U-20. Marselino was called up for his first AFF Championship tournament by Shin Tae-yong. he scored a goal against Philippines in the 2022 AFF Championship group stage, not only that, the goal went viral on social media and caught the attention of the Brazilian's, Richarlison because of his similar goal celebration. He was also awarded the Young Player of the Tournament award.

Career statistics

Club

Notes

International

International goals 
International under-23 goals

International senior goals

Honours 
Indonesia U16
 AFF U-16 Youth Championship third place: 2019
Indonesia U23
 Southeast Asian Games  Bronze medal: 2021

Individual
 Liga 1 Goal of the Month: November 2021, August 2022, January 2023
 Liga 1 Young Player of the Month: December 2021, January 2022, January 2023
 Liga 1 Best Young Player: 2021–22
 APPI Indonesian Football Award Best 11: 2021–22
 APPI Indonesian Football Award Best Young Footballer: 2021–22
 AFF Championship Young Player of the Tournament: 2022

References

External links
 Marselino Ferdinan at Soccerway
 Marselino Ferdinan at Liga Indonesia

2004 births
Living people
Indonesian footballers
Sportspeople from Jakarta
Indonesia youth international footballers
Indonesia international footballers
Indonesian expatriate footballers
Liga 1 (Indonesia) players
Persebaya Surabaya players
Association football midfielders
Competitors at the 2021 Southeast Asian Games
Southeast Asian Games bronze medalists for Indonesia
Southeast Asian Games medalists in football
21st-century Indonesian people